The Most Happy Fella is an album by The Jazz Modes led by horn player Julius Watkins and saxophonist Charlie Rouse recorded in 1957 and released on the Atlantic label. The album features jazz interpretations of songs from Frank Loesser's broadway musical The Most Happy Fella.

Reception
The Allmusic review by  Al Campbell awarded the album 3½ stars and stated "While it didn't match the huge success of such similarly attempted jazzed-up Broadway hits like Shelly Manne's My Fair Lady or the Miles Davis and Gil Evans collaboration on Porgy and Bess, the complex synchronization of Watkins' fluid mellow tone with the moderately choppy tenor lines of Rouse make for a lyrical bop/cool jazz hybrid that still sounds fresh".

Track listing
All compositions by Frank Loesser
 "Standing on the Corner" - 3:45		
 "Joey, Joey, Joey" - 3:56		
 "Warm All Over" - 4:59		
 "Happy to Make Your Acquaintance" - 4:29		
 "My Heart Is So Full of You" - 3:27		
 "The Most Happy Fella" - 3:42		
 "Don't Cry" - 3:09		
 "Like a Woman" - 2:59		
 "Somebody Somewhere" - 3:13

Personnel
Julius Watkins - French horn
Charlie Rouse - tenor saxophone
Gildo Mahones - piano 
Martin Rivera - bass
Ron Jefferson - drums
Eileen Gilbert - vocals (track 5)

References

Atlantic Records albums
Charlie Rouse albums
Julius Watkins albums
1958 albums
Albums produced by Nesuhi Ertegun